Immortus (Nathaniel Richards) is a fictional character appearing in American comic books published by Marvel Comics. He is the future self of Pharaoh Rama-Tut, Scarlet Centurion, Kang the Conqueror, and Iron Lad / Kid Immortus, and a descendant of the scientist of the same name.

Immortus made his feature film debut in the Marvel Cinematic Universe (MCU) film Ant-Man and the Wasp: Quantumania (2023), portrayed by Jonathan Majors. Additionally, Immortus served as inspiration for the character He Who Remains, also portrayed by Majors in the episode "For All Time. Always." from the 2021 first season of the MCU television series Loki.

Publication history
Immortus first appeared in The Avengers #10 and was created by Stan Lee and Jack Kirby. In The Celestial Madonna Saga, Immortus was retroactively established to be the future self of the time-travelling Pharaoh Rama-Tut and Kang the Conqueror, having turned towards a more peaceful outlook on existence.

Fictional character biography
At some point in his personal timeline, Pharaoh Rama-Tut (formerly known as Kang) became weary of battle due to frustration and the loss of his son Marcus and consort Ravonna in several timelines. He was approached by the alien Time-Keepers—time travelers from the end of the universe, the last living creatures in existence—to become their agent, preserving timelines rather than conquering them in exchange for immortality. He accepted and reinvented himself again, this time as Immortus, the lord of the other-dimensional realm of Limbo.

He again came into conflict with the Avengers, but under different circumstances. In his first encounter with the Avengers as Immortus, he attempted the destruction of the Avengers through the use of mythological and historical figures (such as Paul Bunyan, Genghis Khan, Goliath) as combatants after trying to join the Masters of Evil, but being told by Baron Zemo he has to defeat one of the Avengers. The Masters attacked the Avengers after Captain America had been taken to the Tower of London in 1760 where Rick Jones was imprisoned. But when he rescued Rick he was returned to his own time and with his help the Masters were defeated at a near-win. This event was apparently erased after the Enchantress turns back time to prevent the Avengers capturing the Masters. He was partially responsible for the creation of the Vision, allegedly creating a temporal copy of the original Human Torch that the android Ultron used to create the Vision.

Later, he even allied with Kang the Conqueror in one of Kang's schemes against the Avengers and Pharaoh Rama-Tut. He was betrayed by Kang, and imprisoned alongside Pharaoh Rama-Tut while Kang used Immortus's advanced technology to create the first Legion of the Unliving, made up of now-dead characters taken milliseconds before their death. He was subsequently freed by the Avengers, and revealed to be the future persona of Pharaoh Rama-Tut and Kang the Conqueror. He offered to aid the Vision in learning his past. The Legion of the Unliving were defeated and sent back to their own times, and Kang fled.

Later, Immortus officiated at the double wedding of the Vision to the Scarlet Witch, and Mantis to the Swordsman. He next traveled to the Old West with Thor and Moondragon in pursuit of Kang, and assisted the Avengers in the defeat of Kang. Some time later, he allied with the Space Phantom and the giant Tempus, and removed the time travel enchantment from Thor's uru hammer with a trick, though Thor can still manipulate time. Later he revealed that he had caused Kang to find his fortress in Limbo, faked his death by leaving what Kang thought were his remains in his fortress, caused the disturbance in the timestream, and had manipulated him into destroying the Kang divergent doubles to stop their effect on the timestream, as they were creating more timelines and duplicates. The Avengers were brought to Limbo by Kang to help him defeat another version. They were captured but escaped. Immortus revealed himself when it appeared only one Kang was left. Immortus also claimed to have mentally manipulated the rescue of Ravonna, who kept his counter-divergency project under observation. When Kang tried to seize a device Immortus held that contained the memories of the slain Kangs and which Immortus claimed made him master of Limbo, he was driven insane and ran into Limbo due to the force of many memories, which all ended in his defeat. Immortus claimed that was Kang's chance to redeem and condemn himself, and was then questioned by the Avengers on the moral issues of what he had done, but he sent the Avengers back to their own time.

Much later, he was revealed to have a long-term plot for the manipulation of the Avengers. He deleted various time-line universes as part of this plan. His plot to use the Scarlet Witch to become the "absolute master of time" was revealed, and he sent the third Legion of the Unliving to destroy the Avengers. He was rendered catatonic for a time by the Time-Keepers as punishment for his attempt to overthrow their rule.  At this time, the original Human Torch was revealed not to be the progenitor of the Vision, though this discovery was later itself claimed to be a deception created by a Space Phantom.  Manipulating beliefs regarding the relationship between the Torch and the Vision have been a priority for Immortus due to the Vision's connections to the Scarlet Witch, a 'nexus being' who may have been powerful enough to give birth to children who could threaten some of the most powerful cosmic entities in the universe; disrupting the Witch's relationship with the Vision limited the possibility that she would pass on her potential.

Immortus was also responsible for manipulating Iron Man to turn against the Avengers by driving him insane, which resulted in Iron Man's death until he was resurrected by Franklin Richards later.

Immortus also came into conflict with his younger self, who was unable to see the reasoning behind Immortus's and Rama-Tut's actions.<ref>Avengers Forever #1–12 (1998–1999)</ref> Kang's conflict with Immortus was dubbed the "Destiny War", with Kang aiding a group of temporally-displaced Avengers from multiple time periods in competing against Immortus's schemes, Kang now determined to defy his and Rama-Tut's destiny to become Immortus and become the servant of the Time Keepers.

Immortus faked his death several times before ultimately turning on the Time-Keepers to assist the Avengers and, as punishment, was truly killed.  He was resurrected minutes later as temporal energies from the Time-Keepers' attempts to turn Kang directly into Immortus earlier than Rama-Tut had and thus fulfill the time loop caused a backlash—partially due to Kang's will and partly due to the complex temporal energies of the current conflict—that created Rama-Tut, Kang, and Immortus as separate beings, freeing Kang from what he saw as a destiny as a "doddering old scholar".

When the rash actions of Kang caused the timestream to become critically unbalanced, Immortus allied himself with the Next Avengers and future versions of Iron Man and the Hulk in an attempt to undo the damage. Disguising himself as a younger version of Kang, Immortus traveled back to the 21st century and convinced the Avengers to come to the future so that they could understand what had happened. Once the Avengers had successfully restored the timeline, Immortus turned on his allies and killed Iron Man and the Hulk before the youthful Avengers apparently killed him.

Powers and abilities
Immortus has no superpowers, but he does possess a genius-level intellect and amassed an extensive knowledge of chronophysics. It is known that he was tutored by the Time-Keepers themselves, due to him being virtually immortal.

Reception
In 2022, Screen Rant included Immortus in their "10 Most Powerful Hercules Villains In Marvel Comics" list.

Other versions
Immortus appears in the alternate timeline seen in the miniseries Earth X, as Pope of the Church of Immortus. The Church of Immortus's goals are to destroy Reed Richards' Human Torches, allowing mankind to keep their mutations. Upon completing this goal, the Church of Immortus would then leave the Earth to colonize the stars. Immortus is advised in his role by a mysterious man known as Mr. Church, who is Mephisto attempting to lead mankind into its own demise.

Initially, Immortus was able to travel into and out of Limbo at his own will, through use of a time machine. Mephisto would eventually use this to get past his inability to travel into Limbo directly, and would lock Immortus out of Limbo. Eventually, Immortus would be mutated into Kang by the Terrigen Mists, and destroys his time machine in a rage after Mephisto refers to him as Kang, cursing Mephisto for making him Kang again. In his final appearance in the series, he has come to grips with his being Kang, and vows to help Reed Richards undo the damage his Church of Immortus has caused.

In other media
Television
Immortus makes a cameo appearance in the X-Men: The Animated Series episode "Beyond Good and Evil Pt. 4: End and Beginning". This version assumes the identity of a time-stream "custodial engineer" named Bender.

Marvel Cinematic Universe

Characters inspired by Immortus appear in media set in the Marvel Cinematic Universe (MCU), portrayed by Jonathan Majors.
 A composite character partially inspired by Immortus and He Who Remains and named after the latter appears in the Disney+ series Loki episode "For All Time. Always." as the creator of the Time Variance Authority.
 Immortus debuts in the film Ant-Man and the Wasp: Quantumania'' as a leading member of the Council of Kangs.

References

External links
 Immortus at Marvel.com

Characters created by Jack Kirby
Characters created by Stan Lee
Comics about time travel
Comics characters introduced in 1964
Fictional characters who can manipulate time
Fictional characters with immortality
Marvel Comics male supervillains
Marvel Comics supervillains
Time travelers